The Papuan spine-tailed swift (Mearnsia novaeguineae), also known as the Papuan needletail, New Guinea spine-tailed swift or Papua spinetail, is a small (11.5 cm in length), stocky swift with a short, rounded tail and very fast flight.  Head and upperparts glossy blue-black, white or whitish belly and undertail coverts, dark underwing with pale central stripe.  The small spines at the end of the tail are not visible in flight.

Distribution
Endemic to New Guinea where it is widespread in the lowlands and hills up to 550 m.  It has been recorded from Boigu Island, Queensland, Australian territory in north-western Torres Strait.

Habitat
Forest edges, gardens and cleared areas with standing dead trees.

Food
Flying insects.

Breeding
Nests in a high tree hollows.

Conservation
Common and widespread species assessed as being of Least Concern.

References

 Beehler, Bruce M.; & Finch, Brian W. (1985). Species Checklist of the Birds of New Guinea. RAOU Monograph No.1. Royal Australasian Ornithologists Union: Melbourne. 
 Beehler, Bruce M.; Pratt, Thane K.; & Zimmerman, Dale A. (1986). Birds of New Guinea. Wau Ecology Handbook No.9. Princeton University Press. 
 BirdLife International. (2006). Species factsheet: Mearnsia novaeguineae. Downloaded from http://www.birdlife.org on 2 February 2007
 Clarke, Rohan H. (2006). Papuan Spine-tailed Swifts Mearnsia novaeguineae on Boigu Island, Torres Strait, Queensland. Australian Field Ornithology 23: 125–129.
 Coates, Brian J. (1985). The Birds of Papua New Guinea. Volume 1: Non-Passerines. Dover Publications: Alderley, Queensland. 

Papuan spine-tailed swift
Birds of New Guinea
Papuan spine-tailed swift
Papuan spine-tailed swift
Endemic fauna of New Guinea